Jānis Liepiņš may refer to:

 Jānis Liepiņš (painter) (1894–1964), Latvian painter
 Jānis Liepiņš (conductor) (born 1988), Latvian conductor